Eirik Birkelund (born 13 January 1994) is a former Norwegian footballer.

Career

Club
Throughout 2012 he played for SK Brann, which he had joined at youth level from SK Trane. He was selected for his senior debut in the Norwegian Premier League on 10 June 2011 as a substitute against Sogndal. In 2012, he played three league matches and one cup match.

In June 2014, Birkelund re-signed for SK Brann on an 18-month contract.

In the summer of 2019 Birkelund decide to quit football to and begin on a medicine study.

Career statistics

Club

References

External links

1994 births
Living people
Footballers from Bergen
Norwegian footballers
Association football midfielders
SK Brann players
Eliteserien players
AS Saint-Étienne players
Norwegian expatriate footballers
Expatriate footballers in France
Norwegian expatriate sportspeople in France